New Jerusalem Airport  is a nontowered, public airport located seven nautical miles (8.1 miles; 13 km) southeast of the central business district of Tracy, a city in San Joaquin County, California, United States. It is owned by the City of Tracy.

Facilities and aircraft 
It has one runway designated 12/30 with an asphalt surface measuring 3,530 by 60 feet (1,076 × 18 m). A second, parallel runway was built initially but fell into disrepair and is not used by general aviation.

For the 12-month period ending March 5, 2019, the airport had 4,000 general aviation aircraft operations, an average of 10 per day. Due to the airport's lack of hangars, there were no aircraft based at this airport as of August 2019.

History
The airport takes its name from the locale near New Jerusalem Elementary School. In 1874, local pioneer Henry Ebe, whose family were Dunkard Brethren, donated the land for the school, stipulating that it take that name.

World War II
During World War II, the airport was designated as New Jerusalem Auxiliary Airfield (No 2), and was an auxiliary training airfield for Stockton Army Airfield, California.

In media
In 1989, the airport was used as a filming location for the Steven Spielberg film Always. Miniature radio-controlled planes were used by Industrial Light and Magic to create special effects for aerial firefighting scenes.

The airport was used in several episodes of the Discovery Channel television show MythBusters, including "Duct Tape Plane".

See also
 
 California World War II Army Airfields

References

External links 
 Aerial photo as of 23 May 1993 from USGS The National Map
 
 San Joaquin Historian, January - March 1974, describing the early history of the New Jerusalem area

Airfields of the United States Army Air Forces in California
Airports in San Joaquin County, California
Tracy, California
United States Army airfields